Mountain Brook is a city in southeastern Jefferson County, Alabama, United States, and a suburb of Birmingham. Its population at the 2020 census was 22,461.

History
The city was originally developed in 1929 by real-estate businessman Robert Jemison, Jr., as a whites-only suburb of Birmingham along the ridges known as Red Mountain and Shades Mountain. It was incorporated on May 24, 1942. The plans, by Boston-based landscape architect Warren H. Manning, called for estate-sized lots along winding scenic roads and denser commercial development centering on three picturesque "villages": English Village, Mountain Brook Village and Crestline Village. Most of Mountain Brook's development preserved the existing trees: 92.03% is under tree cover, one of the highest ratios in the nation. Residential sections such as Cherokee Bend, Brookwood Forest, Overton, and Crestline have houses in a forest setting, with a recreational network of bridle paths. This has protected the area from urban encroachment.

Mountain Brook is the location of the first office park in the U.S., built in 1955. It featured the then novel concepts of ample free parking and low-profile office buildings surrounded by waterspouts and landscaped grounds.

A new city hall, including a fire and police station, was completed in 2013.

Geography

Demographics

2020 census

As of the 2020 United States census, there were 22,461 people and 8,365 households.

2010 census
As of the census of 2010, there were 20,413 people, 7,731 households, and 5,864 families residing in the city. The racial makeup of the city was 97.2% White, 1.0% Black or African American, 0.1% Native American, 0.9% Asian, 0.0% Pacific Islander, 0.2% from other races, and 0.6% from two or more races. 1.0% of the population were Hispanic or Latino of any race.

There were 7,731 households, out of which 37.7% had children under the age of 18 living with them, 68.2% were married couples living together, 6.4% had a female householder with no husband present, and 24.1% were non-families. 22.0% of all households were made up of individuals, and 9.9% had someone living alone who was 65 years of age or older. The average household size was 2.64 and the average family size was 3.12.

The population was spread out, with 29.3% under the age of 18, 4.5% from 18 to 24, 20.8% from 25 to 44, 29.7% from 45 to 64, and 15.7% who were 65 years of age or older. The median age was 41.9 years. For every 100 females, there were 89.7 males. For every 100 females age 18 and over, there were 85.4 males.

The median income for a household was $130,721, and the median income for a family was $164,750. Males had a median income of $124,224 versus $54,420 for females. The per capita income for the city was $76,763. 1.8% of families and 3.7% of individuals were below the poverty line, including 2.1% of individuals under 18 and 2.5% of those 65 and over.

According to a list compiled in 2008 by Stephen Higley, it is the ninth wealthiest community in the United States. It is often referred to as "The Tiny Kingdom" due to its high concentration of the region's business and professional leaders, and the disparity of wealth between it and Birmingham where according to census data nearly a quarter of the population lives below the poverty line.

Government

Mountain Brook has a city council/mayor/city manager system of government.

The city council, consisting of five members elected at large, considers most issues and appoints the police chief and fire chief.

The mayor is Stewart Welch, III, first elected in 2016.

The city manager is Sam Gaston, appointed by the council and mayor in January 2008.

Education

The Mountain Brook School System is consistently rated one of the best in the state. It includes the following six schools, all of which have been awarded the Blue Ribbon:
Brookwood Forest Elementary
Cherokee Bend Elementary
Crestline Elementary
Mountain Brook Elementary
Mountain Brook Junior High
Mountain Brook High School

Notable people

 Lou Anders, writer
 Jay Barker, former NFL player
 Nate Bland, former MLB player (Houston Astros)
 Scott Bondy, an American folk/alternative musician. Formerly lead singer of the band Verbena.
 Gregg Carr, orthopedist and former Pittsburgh Steelers football player
 Courteney Cox, actress
 Tommy Dewey, actor (17 Again, The BabyMakers, The Mindy Project)
 Pat DuPré, semi-finalist at Wimbledon in 1979 and a quarter finalist in the U.S. Open. 1979–1981; he was ranked in the top 20 in the world, reaching as high as 12th.
 Sara Evans, country music singer
 Basil Hirschowitz, gastroenterologist
 Natalee Holloway, unsolved disappearance
 Alan Hunter, MTV Veejay
 Kate Jackson, Hollywood actress; star of Charlie's Angels as well as Scarecrow and Mrs. King
 David Jaffe, video game designer (God of War, Twisted Metal)
 Doug Jones, former U.S. senator from Alabama
 Don Logan former CEO of Time Warner Inc
 Graeme McFarland, football player (Indiana University)
 Tribble Reese, actor
 Emeel Salem, All-American baseball player at the University of Alabama, former minor league player in the Tampa Bay Rays organization. (6th round draft pick 2007)
 Sarah Simmons, Top 8 finalist on season 4 of The Voice.
 Luther Strange, former U.S. senator from Alabama
 Barret Swatek, Hollywood actress, Republican activist and recurring talk-show guest
 William Vlachos, center for the University of Alabama National Championship Team in 2009 and 2011.

Cultural references
In South and West: From a Notebook, Joan Didion writes, "It is said that the dead center of Birmingham society is the southeast corner of the locker room at the Mountain Brook country club." She adds, "it is hard to make the connection between this Birmingham and that of Bull Connor."

During his 1970 gubernatorial campaign, George Wallace derisively referred to Mountain Brook as "where the rich folks live in the suburbs up across the mountain from Birmingham."

References

External links

City of Mountain Brook website

 
Cities in Alabama
Cities in Jefferson County, Alabama
Birmingham metropolitan area, Alabama
Historic American Landscapes Survey in Alabama
Populated places established in 1929